Strength in Numbers is the seventh studio album by the southern rock band 38 Special, released in 1986. This album was the last one to feature the founding member and co-frontman Don Barnes, until he rejoined the band in 1992.

Track listing
"Somebody Like You" (Don Barnes, Jeff Carlisi, Larry Steele, Donnie Van Zant, Jim Vallance) – 4:08
"Like No Other Night" (Barnes, Carlisi, Vallance, John Bettis) – 3:59
"Last Time" (Barnes, Carlisi, Vallance) – 3:36
"Once in a Lifetime" (Barnes, Vallance) – 3:39
"Just a Little Love" (Carlisi, Barnes, Bettis, Gary O'Connor) – 3:34
"Has There Ever Been a Good Goodbye" (Barnes, Carlisi, Steele, Vallance, Bettis) – 3:55
"One in a Million" (Barnes, Carlisi, Vallance) – 3:49
"Heart's on Fire" (Barnes, Carlisi, Van Zant, Bettis) – 4:15
"Against the Night" (Barnes, Van Zant, Bettis, Sam Bryant, Greg Redding) – 3:34
"Never Give an Inch" (Van Zant, Bryant, Roy Freeland) – 4:56

Personnel

.38 Special 
 Don Barnes – guitars, lead vocals, backing vocals 
 Donnie Van Zant – backing  vocals, lead vocals (9, 10)
 Jeff Carlisi – guitars, steel guitar
 Larry Junstrom – bass
 Steve Brookins – drums
 Jack Grondin – drums

Additional musicians 
 Bill Cuomo – keyboards
 Mike Porcaro – bass
 Denny Carmassi – drums
 Jim Vallance – drums
 Jerry Peterson – saxophone
 Earl Lon Price – saxophone
 Nick Lane – trombone
 Michael Cichowicz – trumpet
 Carol Bristow – backing vocals
 Tom Kelly –  backing vocals

Production 
 Keith Olsen – producer, engineer 
 Brian Foraker – engineer 
 Greg Fulginiti – mastering 
 Artisan Sound Recorders
 Norman Moore – art direction, design 
 Dennis Keeley – photography 
 Mark Spector – management 
 Joni Gosney – management

Charts
Album – Billboard (United States)

Singles – Billboard (United States)

Notes 

38 Special (band) albums
1986 albums
A&M Records albums
Albums produced by Keith Olsen